The Black-Foxe Military Institute was a private school in  Hollywood, California, USA. It was located adjacent to the Wilshire Country Club to the west and south and the Los Angeles Tennis Club to the east.

Black-Foxe was founded in 1928 by Charles E. Toberman, a Hollywood developer and financier, and Majors Earle Foxe and Harry Lee Black, both World War I veterans, on the site formerly occupied by Urban Military Academy, where Black had been commandant; Foxe was president, remaining in that post until 1960, Black commandant of cadets and Major Harry Gaver headmaster. From the start the school attracted the sons of people involved in the film industry, thanks to its location and Foxe's Hollywood connections.

In 1954 Gaver died, and in 1959 Toberman sold the school to Raymond Rosendahl. In the early 1960s the name was changed to The Black-Foxe School.

In 1965 Rosendahl sold the school to a nonprofit group that was unable to make a success of it, and in 1968 the mortgage holder foreclosed and Black-Foxe closed.

Alumni 
 Jack Banta, American football halfback in the National Football League (NFL) for the Philadelphia Eagles, the Washington Redskins and Los Angeles Rams. He played college football at the University of Southern California and was drafted in the 1941 NFL Draft.
 Harry Carey Jr., actor
 Charles Chaplin, Jr., Actor, son of Charlie Chaplin
 Guillermo Endara, President of Panama from 1989 to 1994
 Larry Hagman, actor
 Alan Hale Jr., actor known for playing The Skipper on Gilligan's Island
 Brown Meggs, record executive, novelist. Signed the Beatles to Capitol Records in 1963.
 Robert Wagner, actor
 Gene Wilder, actor; attended briefly, he wrote that he was bullied and sexually assaulted, primarily because he was the only Jewish boy in the school.

References 

Defunct United States military academies
Educational institutions established in 1928
History of Los Angeles
Defunct schools in California
1928 establishments in California